Resurrection Blvd. is an American dramatic series which aired on Showtime for three seasons from 2000 to 2002.

Plot
In East Los Angeles, California, the Santiago family has had three generations of boxers within the family. They continue their battle to become boxing champions while struggling with the difficulties of making life choices and breaking away from family tradition. Roberto Santiago (Tony Plana) is ill and struggles as he watches his family cope with the various hardships they must face.

Cast

Episodes

Season 1 (2000–01)

Season 2 (2001)

Season 3 (2002)

External links
 

Showtime (TV network) original programming
2000s American drama television series
2000 American television series debuts
2002 American television series endings
Television shows set in Los Angeles
Television series by CBS Studios
English-language television shows